Henry Curtis was a VC recipient.

Henry Curtis may also refer to:
Henry Curtis (British Army officer) (1888–1964), British Army officer
Sir Henry Curtis, fictional character in adventure novels
Henry Curtis, fictional character in the novel 419

See also

Harry Curtis (disambiguation)